In mathematics, the Jacobi zeta function Z(u) is the logarithmic derivative of the Jacobi theta function Θ(u). It is also commonly denoted as  
 

 

Where E, K, and F are generic Incomplete Elliptical Integrals of the first and second kind.  Jacobi Zeta Functions being kinds of Jacobi theta functions have applications to all their relevant fields and application. 

This relates Jacobi's common notation of, . to Jacobi's Zeta function.
Some additional relations include ,

References

https://booksite.elsevier.com/samplechapters/9780123736376/Sample_Chapters/01~Front_Matter.pdf Pg.xxxiv

http://mathworld.wolfram.com/JacobiZetaFunction.html

Special functions